Derek Maguire is an American retired ice hockey defenseman who was an All-American for Harvard.

Career
Maguire was a star player for Delbarton School, helping his team win four consecutive Mennen Cups and win a share of the state championship as a junior. After graduating in 1990, he was selected by the Montreal Canadiens in the NHL Draft and then began attending Harvard University in the fall. Maguire was a more defensive-oriented player in college, playing against tougher opponents, but he was still able to help the Crimson finish atop the ECAC Hockey standings for three consecutive years. In his senior season, Maguire's offensive game came alive and he more than doubled his previous career best. He was named an All-American and pushed Harvard to an ECAC championship and an appearance in the Frozen Four.

After graduating with a degree in environmental science and public policy, Maguire began his professional career with the Fredericton Canadiens. He helped the team make a surprise run to the Calder Cup finals in 1995 and looked to be on track for a lengthy career, however, after just 7 games the following season, Maguire retired as a player and began working as a bond trader for Merrill Lynch. Over the course of several years, Maguire worked his way up through the company and is current the global director of rate sales (as of 2021). 

He was inducted into the New Jersey High School Ice Hockey Hall of Fame in 2010.

Statistics

Regular season and playoffs

Awards and honors

References

External links

1971 births
Living people
AHCA Division I men's ice hockey All-Americans
American men's ice hockey defensemen
Ice hockey players from New York (state)
Sportspeople from Rochester, New York
Harvard Crimson men's ice hockey players
Fredericton Canadiens players
Montreal Canadiens draft picks